The following radio stations broadcast on AM frequency 1570 kHz: 1570 AM is a Mexican clear-channel frequency, with XERF Ciudad Acuña, Coahuila, as the dominant Class A station. See List of broadcast station classes.

Argentina
 LRI 223 in Lomas de Zamora, Buenos Aires (Still not active)
 Rocha in La Plata, Buenos Aires

Brazil
 ZYH 621 in Senador Pompeu, Ceará
 ZYH 907 in Coroatá, Maranhão
 ZYL 242 in Itajubá, Minas Gerais
 ZYJ 341 in Nova Aurora, Paraná
 ZYJ 493 in Valença, Rio de Janeiro
 ZYK 358 in Gravataí, Rio Grande do Sul
 ZYJ 832 in Tangará, Santa Catarina
 ZYK 651 in Santo André, São Paulo
 ZYK 648 in Santa Rita do Passa Quatro, São Paulo

Canada
 CJLV in Laval, Quebec - 10 kW, transmitter located at

Mexico
Stations in bold are clear-channel stations.
 XERF-AM in Ciudad Acuña, Coahuila - 100 kW, transmitter located at

United States

External links
 FCC list of radio stations on 1570 kHz

References

Lists of radio stations by frequency